Christian H. Godefroy (25 October 1948 - 17 November 2012) was a French author of self-improvement books.

Godefroy's books included Mind Dynamics, How to write a letter that sells, Time management System, Expressive learning system and Infopreneur. He also started a publishing company and founded CORESPRIT, an annual gathering of self-improvement motivators.

References

External links
 Online biography
 Positive-club

2012 deaths
1948 births
French didactic writers
French male non-fiction writers